Pithauria marsena, the banded straw ace, is a butterfly in the family Hesperiidae. It is found from Sikkim to Burma and in Thailand, Laos, northern Vietnam, China, Malaysia, as well as on Borneo, Sumatra, Nias, Natuna, Java and Bali.

References

Butterflies described in 1866
Astictopterini
Butterflies of Asia
Taxa named by William Chapman Hewitson